Communist Party of Nepal (United) was a political party in Nepal. In 1991, after the first general election, through the merger of Communist Party of Nepal (Democratic), Communist Party of Nepal (Burma) and Communist Party of Nepal (Amatya). Both the Burma and Amatya-led factions did however break away from the party soon after the merger. The youth wing of the party was called Nepal National Youth Federation. Its trade union wing was called Nepal Trade Union Federation.

History 
The general secretary of CPN (United) was Bishnu Bahadur Manandhar and the deputy general secretary Ganesh Shah.

Following the February 1, 2005 royal take-over in Nepal, both Manandhar and Shah were arrested. In 2005 the party merged with the Communist Party of Nepal (Marxist) and formed the Communist Party of Nepal (United Marxist).

Electoral performance

See also
 List of communist parties in Nepal

References 

Defunct communist parties in Nepal
Political parties established in 1991
1991 establishments in Nepal
Political parties disestablished in 2005
2005 disestablishments in Nepal